Metropolis is an eight-part British television drama series, created and written by playwright Peter Morgan, that first broadcast on ITV on 1 May 2000. Produced and directed by Glenn Wilhide, and co-directed by Tim Whitby, the series follows a group of former university graduates who leave Leeds to start a new life in London. The series featured a notable cast including Matthew Rhys, Louise Lombard, Kris Marshall, Flora Montgomery, Emily Bruni, Jason Barry, James Fox and James Purefoy.

The series, described as "a more with-it Cold Feet", was produced by Granada Television, and broadcast over five nights, with the initial four hour-long episodes broadcasting on consecutive Mondays and Tuesdays at 10:00pm. The final, half-hour episode broadcast at 10:30pm on Monday 15 May. Music for the series was composed by Jonathan Whitehead. Despite gathering an adequate viewing audience, and moderately successful critical reviews, a second series was not commissioned, with the failure to be recommissioned blamed on "haphazard scheduling" and the change in episode length.

The series was later considered for an American re-make by Veronica Mars creator Rob Thomas, but the pilot episode, filmed in 2008, was not picked up by ABC. Similarly, Thomas tried to revive the project in 2012 with The CW, although once again, never made it past the pilot stage. The complete series was released as a double VHS on 16 June 2000. The VHS release combines all five episodes into two feature length presentations, of 115 and 90 minutes respectively.

Critical reception
The Guardian described the series as a "stylish but trashy thriller", noting mixed reviews from other critics. A 2012 review of the fellow ITV series Love Life also described the series as "ITV's failed attempt to replicate the Cold Feet magic", and a "fairly standard flat share drama."

Eddie Holt of the Irish Times said of the first episode; "Metropolis is much more plot-driven than This Life and its narcissism is not as screaming. Written by Peter Morgan, who has travelled the drugs and rehab circuit, it displays an admirable knowingness in parts. Alastair, a sad buffoon really, has stolen cheques from his parents and is about to check into an expensive rehab clinic. But the thriller aspect of the series, pivoting on Nathan's stalking of Tanya, is too daft. More credible, given Charlotte's bedding by the wealthy sleazebag, is Matthew's loutish pursuit of frightened, but flattered, Sophie. Atmospheric "big city" shots – trains snaking between high-rise buildings; offices overlooking the bustle of the streets; commuters swarming from the Underground – supply mood and context. Likewise, individual scenes, such as Tanya's accident, partly shot from inside the crashed car."

"However, the social context of dynamic, thrusting females and work-shy, parasitic males seems overstated. Perhaps, as hyperbole, this is valid, but as actuality the gender contrast is hardly that stark yet, even among London's graduate twentysomethings. An eight-parter, airing twice weekly, Metropolis presents a cast of characters with obvious similarities to the first-year lawyers of This Life. Charlotte, stuck with a feckless, live-in lover, does a Milly by becoming involved with a powerful, older man. But her ambition also means that she's not unlike Anna, the Scottish siren whose appetite for men was surpassed only by her ruthlessness for career success."

"No doubt it was tempting to add a thriller dimension to the old formula. But the implausibility of the stalker sub-plot detracts from the aimed-for realism. Of the women, only Sophie, despite reneging spectacularly on her student vow to remain a lifelong socialist, elicits sympathy. The gap between university ideals and job-market realities has always hit twentysomethings, and the atomisation of student friends when career concerns kick-in is a valid theme. Even if you might envy the youth of this sextet, you'd be glad not to have to live their lives."

Plot
We are introduced to the six-pack of Metropolis as they leave Leeds University. Cut to five years later. The three women, Charlotte (Louise Lombard), Sophie (Flora Montgomery) and Tanya (Emily Bruni) are, respectively, a junior financial hackette on a magazine, a researcher for the Conservative Party and an agony aunt. Only one of the men, Frank (Kris Marshall), works and he feels compelled to turn the tables on his insurance company employers. As an implausibly idealistic loss adjustor, he is disgusted by the company's scams to avoid pay-outs. He fiddles the claims in favour of the claimants. Matthew (Matthew Rhys) and Alastair (Jason Barry) have remained dope-smoking slackers. Ambitious Charlotte lives with indolent Matthew. Charlotte acts like a junior Sue Ellen Ewing – many lip gymnastics and soulful stares.

Mind you, unlike the richter-scale efforts of Texan Sue Ellen, Charlotte's lip tremors are tiny English quivers. Anyway, she cheats on Matthew and takes up with sixty-two-year-old billionaire lecher Milton Friedkin (James Fox). He feeds her career-enhancing stories and she feeds him her twenty-seven-year-old nubility. Primed by her sugar daddy, she gets her "first official byline". Meanwhile, Tanya is in a car crash. When she wakes up in hospital, a stalker, Nathan (James Purefoy) is managing, quite successfully and utterly unbelievably, to convince her that he is her boyfriend. The crash must have caused selective amnesia, he tells her. Fancying the nutter, she goes along with it in spite of the warnings of Sophie. As an agony aunt, she'd better write a letter to herself pretty quickly, because this one looks like it's going to end in tears if not worse.

Cast
 Matthew Rhys as Matthew Bishop; a law ethics graduate 
 Louise Lombard as Charlotte Owen; a reporter for a financial newspaper
 Kris Marshall as Frank Green; an intern insurance claims broker
 Jason Barry as Alistair Hibbert; an alcoholic drug addict
 Flora Montgomery as Sophie Hamilton; junior political researcher
 Emily Bruni as Tanya Rubens; agony aunt for a local radio station
 James Fox as Milton Friedkin; a wealthy banker 
 James Purefoy as Nathan; a sociopath who begins to stalk Tanya
 Michael Elphick as Andrew Kaplan; Frank Green's boss
 Alexi Kaye Campbell as David Manning; Sophie Hamilton's boss
 John McArdle as Steve Norris; Alastair's rehab councillor
 Anna Nygh as Eleanor Scott; party rival of David Manning
 Gina Bellman as Clara Keshishian; a wealthy Jewish widow

Episodes

References

External links
 

2000 British television series debuts
2000 British television series endings
2000s British drama television series
ITV television dramas
2000s British television miniseries
British thriller television series
Television series by ITV Studios
Television shows produced by Granada Television
English-language television shows
Television shows set in Manchester